Gheorghe Şerban (25 June 1954 – 31 December 1998) was a Romanian journalist, politician and writer, best known for his role in the writing of the Proclamation of Timișoara in the wake of the 1989 Revolution.

Şerban was born in Buzău. Before 1989, he taught Marxism at Polytechnic University of Timișoara. After taking part in the Revolution, he became a member of the Timișoara Society and a journalist for Timișoara newspaper.

In 1994, he joined the Christian Democratic National Peasants' Party (PNȚ-CD) and was later elected to the Chamber of Deputies for Timiș County.

Christian Democratic National Peasants' Party politicians
Members of the Chamber of Deputies (Romania)
People of the Romanian Revolution
Academic staff of the Politehnica University of Timișoara
Romanian journalists
Romanian Marxists
Romanian political scientists
People from Buzău
1954 births
1998 deaths
20th-century journalists
20th-century political scientists